Nazim-e-Faisalabad is the mayor who heads the Faisalabad Municipal Corporation (FMC) which controls the local government of Faisalabad.

Faisalabad Municipal Corporation 
Faisalabad local government is led by Faisalabad Municipal Corporation which consists of 157 union councils.

List of mayors

Local government elections 2015 

Following are the results of the Faisalabad local government election, held on 31 October 2015.

References 

Mayors, Lahore